Tobias Lindholm (born 5 July 1977) is a Danish screenwriter and film director. His 2015 directed film A War was nominated for an Academy Award for Best Foreign Language Film. In addition to A War, he has directed the films R (2010), A Hijacking (2012), and The Good Nurse (2022). He has also written for multiple films and TV series.

Early life

Lindholm was born in Næstved in 1977. He graduated from the National Film School of Denmark in Copenhagen in 2007.

Career
Lindholm first received attention for his work as a television writer on the popular Danish political TV-series Borgen, credited on all 20 episodes of the series' first two seasons, either as an episode writer or storyline contributor. Then, in 2011, Lindholm was awarded a special Bodil Award for having two feature films Submarino (as co-writer) and R (as director and writer) in competition for that year's Best Danish Film, which the latter movie also won. His hostage drama A Hijacking (2012) premiered at the 2012 Venice Film Festival in the Orizzonti section.

He is also a frequent collaborator with film director Thomas Vinterberg, with whom he has written the screenplays for feature films Submarino (2010), The Hunt (2012) and Another Round (2020)

Lindholm directed the 2015 drama A War about a Danish military company in Afghanistan that is captured by the Taliban, and the commander is accused of war crimes. The film was nominated for the Best Foreign Language Film at the 88th Academy Awards.

Personal life
Lindholm is married to film producer Caroline Blanco with whom he has three sons. They live in Copenhagen.

Filmography 
Film

Documentary films

Television

References

Further reading

External links 
 

1977 births
Living people
Danish male screenwriters
European Film Award for Best Screenwriter winners
Film directors from Copenhagen
Bodil Special Award recipients
People from Næstved Municipality